This page is a list of 2020 UCI WorldTeams. These teams competed in the 2020 UCI World Tour.

Teams overview 
The 19 WorldTeams in 2020 are:

Notes

References

See also 

 2020 in men's road cycling
 List of 2020 UCI Professional Continental and Continental teams
 List of 2020 UCI Women's Teams and riders

2020 in men's road cycling
2020